Lipno nad Vltavou is a municipality and village in Český Krumlov District in the South Bohemian Region of the Czech Republic. It has about 600 inhabitants. It is a popular summer resort.

Administrative parts
The village of Slupečná is an administrative part of Lipno nad Vltavou.

Geography
Lipno nad Vltavou is located on the Vltava river on the shore of the Lipno Reservoir, which was named after the village. It lies in the Bohemian Forest mountain range.

History
The first written mention of Lipno nad Vltavou is from 1530. It was originally a small lumbering settlement belonging to the Vyšší Brod estate. During the construction of the Lipno Reservoir between 1952 and 1959, the settlement was flooded and a new resort was built instead.

Economy

Thanks to its location by the Lipno Reservoir, Lipno nad Vltavou is one of the most popular tourist and recreational places in the country. Lipno Reservoir is used for recreation, water sports, and fish-farming. The Lipno Hydroelectric Power Station has been in operation since 1959 and has nameplate capacity 2x60 MW.

Sport
Lipno nad Vltavou hosted the 1967 ICF Canoe Slalom World Championships.

Sights
Treetop Walkway in Lipno nad Vltavou is among the most visited tourist destinations in the South Bohemian Region. It is an educational trail with an observation tower and toboggans.

References

External links

Villages in Český Krumlov District
Bohemian Forest